Orange Records was a record label located in Mobile, Alabama. It was started in 1959. It was a subsidiary of Sandy Records. Its artists included Jackie Morningstar, Billy Clark, and the Smith Brothers.

See also
 List of record labels

Record labels established in 1959
Defunct record labels of the United States